Urus may refer to:

 Aurochs, a type of cattle
 𐌿, a letter of the Gothic alphabet
 Urs, death anniversary of a Sufi saint, mostly observed in South Asia
 Urus Khan (died 1377), a Khan of the Blue Horde between 1374 and 1376
 Uru people, an ethnic group in Bolivia
 Lamborghini Urus, a mid-size SUV from Lamborghini
 Uruş, Beypazarı, Turkey
 Yanarahu (Carhuaz-Huaraz) or Urus, a mountain in Peru
 An annual festival in India; see Jatra (Maharashtra)